All Saints' Church is the ancient parish church of Fulham, in the County of Middlesex, pre-dating the Reformation. It is now an Anglican church in Fulham, London, sited close to the River Thames, beside the northern approach to Putney Bridge. The church tower and interior nave and chancel are Grade II* listed.

History

There has been a church on the same site for more than 900 years. Barbara Denny, a historian of London, writes that the first record of a church here dates from 1154 in the rolls of a tithe dispute. Apart from the tower, construction of which began in 1440, the present church building dates from the late Victorian period, having been rebuilt in 1880–1881 by Sir Arthur Blomfield using squared rubblestone, ashlar dressings and windows in the Perpendicular style. The church retains many memorials from the earlier church along with a plaque to the First World War dead of the 25th (County of London) Cyclist Battalion of the London Regiment, whose drill hall was at Fulham House from 1908 onwards.

The building and its churchyard are situated next to Bishop's Park, overlooking the River Thames. The church has a long association with the bishops of London as lords of the manor of Fulham, and is the burial place for many of them. The nearby Fulham Palace is the former manor of Fulham and the former residence of the bishops of London.

Putney Bridge, like its predecessor Fulham Bridge, is unique in that it is the only bridge in Britain to have a church at both ends: the ancient St Mary's Church is located in Putney on the south bank, and All Saints' Church, Fulham, is on the north bank.

Notable burials

Bishops of London
Due to the proximity of All Saints to Fulham Palace, the ancient residence of the Bishop of London, several bishops of London were buried at All Saints.
 Humphrey Henchman (d. 1675)
 Henry Compton (d. 1713)
 John Robinson (d. 1723)
 Edmund Gibson (d. 1748)
 Thomas Sherlock (d. 1761)
 Thomas Hayter  (d. 1762)
 Richard Terrick (d. 1777)
 Robert Lowth (d. 1787)
 John Randolph (d. 1813)
 Charles James Blomfield (d. 1857)
 John Jackson (d. 1885)

Other burials
 William John Burchell (1781–1863) – explorer, naturalist, traveller, artist, and author
 Sir William Butts – physician to King Henry VIII
 Jeffery Ekins – Dean of Carlisle, 1782–1791
 Elizabeth Hatsell – wife of John Hatsell (Clerk of the House of Commons 1768–1820) and sister of Jeffery Ekins
 Henry Holland – architect
 Nathaniel Kent – agriculturalist
 Alexander Marshal (circa 1620–1682) – merchant, gardener and botanical illustrator
 John Mordaunt, 1st Viscount Mordaunt – royalist, prominent in the English Civil War
 John Saris – captain on the first English voyage to land in Japan
 Granville Sharp – abolitionist
 William Sharp – surgeon
 Sir William Withers – Lord Mayor of London
 George London – landscape gardener and gardener to Bishop Compton

In the media
The church was featured in the film The Omen, in a scene which begins in Bishop's Park, and ends with a bizarre accident where a priest (played by Patrick Troughton) is impaled by a lightning conductor on the top of the tower that is dislodged when it is hit by lightning.

In 2017, the Christmas Day service from the church was shown on BBC Television.

References

External links

 
 British history online, Fulham

Church of England church buildings in the London Borough of Hammersmith and Fulham
Grade II* listed churches in London
Grade II* listed buildings in the London Borough of Hammersmith and Fulham
Diocese of London
Churches on the Thames
History of the London Borough of Hammersmith and Fulham
Fulham